The sketch comedy television show Saturday Night Live (SNL) has for almost three decades aired a number of sketches parodying Hillary Clinton, from her time as First Lady, and during both her presidential campaigns in 2008 and 2016.

A total of nine different performers have played Hillary Clinton on SNL. The array of SNL cast members portraying Clinton has included Jan Hooks, Janeane Garofalo, Vanessa Bayer, Ana Gasteyer, Amy Poehler, and Kate McKinnon. Guest stars playing Clinton have included Drew Barrymore and Rachel Dratch.  One sketch featured Miley Cyrus in a guest appearance as Clinton, rapping: "What's up y'all? I'm like Hillary Clinton, and I wanna be president one day."

History 

Jan Hooks was the first to portray Hillary Clinton, and after Hooks left the show in 1991, she returned later to make several subsequent guest appearances as Hillary, with Phil Hartman as Hillary's husband Bill Clinton. One of the earliest Jan Hooks sketches, which aired in May 1993, features her interpretation of Hillary eager to be a "co-president" with Bill, now the newly elected president. Hooks' Hillary tells her husband about her big plans for his health care bill, and gets into a fistfight with Senator Bob Dole (Dan Aykroyd).

Beginning with the 1994 season, Janeane Garofalo played Hillary as First Lady, with Michael McKean portraying president Clinton.

Ana Gasteyer played Hillary during the Lewinsky scandal of the late 1990s, as well as during her run for the U.S. Senate in New York, with Darrell Hammond playing the role of her husband. In one Gasteyer sketch, set in the Clintons' Chappaqua kitchen, with Hillary making an attempt to appear more personable for the cameras during her Senate campaign, she says, "I can't wait to prepare some food dishes in this kitchen, such as salads and toast."

SNL cast member Amy Poehler had the longest-running role as Clinton, playing the role regularly from 2003 to 2008 (and reprising it twice, in 2012 and 2015). During the 2008–09 season, the show aired several critically acclaimed sketches featuring Poehler as Clinton, and Tina Fey as Sarah Palin. Hillary Clinton first made an appearance on the show and faced off with Poehler as her doppelgänger.

Kate McKinnon has portrayed Clinton regularly since March 2015. Darrell Hammond has stated that he only agreed to reprise his role as Bill Clinton because McKinnon was so good in her role, calling her a "virtuoso".

In the 2014–2015 season, SNL began airing another series of Hillary Clinton sketches, on the occasion of Clinton's announcement of her candidacy for the 2016 presidential campaign, with Kate McKinnon now as Clinton. Former SNL cast member Darrell Hammond returned to reprise his portrayal of Bill Clinton in previous season skits.

McKinnon again portrayed Clinton on October 17, 2015, for SNLs rendering of the Democratic Primary Presidential debate which had aired on CNN on October 13.

On October 8, 2016, in episode 2 of season 42, Kate McKinnon played Hillary Clinton after her headquarters obtained news of Donald Trump talking about how he could grab women "by the pussy", something he did say in real life.

See also 
 Saturday Night Live parodies of Joe Biden
 Saturday Night Live parodies of George H. W. Bush
 Saturday Night Live parodies of Bill Clinton
 Saturday Night Live parodies of Sarah Palin
 Saturday Night Live parodies of Donald Trump

References

External links 
 Politicians Who've Appeared on SNL – AP

Cultural depictions of Hillary Clinton
2008 United States presidential election in popular culture
2016 United States presidential election in popular culture
Clinton, Hillary
Clinton, Hillary
Clinton, Hillary
Clinton, Hillary
American political satire